William Christopher Moore (September 3, 1902 – January 24, 1984) was a Major League Baseball pitcher who played in one game for the Detroit Tigers on April 15, . He faced three batters, and allowed three base on balls and two earned runs.

External links

1902 births
1984 deaths
Detroit Tigers players
Major League Baseball pitchers
Baseball players from New York (state)
People from Corning, New York